William Thomas Manger (5 February 1900 – 4 August 1958) was a former Australian rules footballer who played with Carlton and Essendon in the Victorian Football League (VFL).

Notes

External links 

Bill Manger's profile at Blueseum

1900 births
Carlton Football Club players
Essendon Football Club players
Australian rules footballers from Victoria (Australia)
1958 deaths
Australian rules footballers from Western Australia
Australian rules footballers from Geraldton